Efemçukuru is a  village in Menderes district of İzmir Province, Turkey. The population of Efemçukuru is 533   as of 2011. Main agricultural product is olive. The village has also specialised in organic farming. Efemçukuru was used to be a forest village. But beginning by 2008, the forests around the village are assigned to a Canadian company, Eldorado Gold, for gold mining.

References

Villages in İzmir Province
Menderes (Cumaovası) District